Tunisian Sign Language is the sign language used by deaf people in Tunisia. It derives from Italian Sign Language, mixed with indigenous sign.

It is not clear how the language of the Burj as-Salh deaf village relates to indigenous sign and TSL.

See also 

 Deafness in Tunisia

References

French Sign Language family
Languages of Tunisia